Jacks Mountain Tunnel is a railroad tunnel located in Adams County, Pennsylvania about  southwest of Fairfield.  It was built in 1889 by the Baltimore and Harrisburg Railway, which was later acquired by the Western Maryland Railway. The tunnel is currently owned by CSX Transportation and operates as part of the Hanover Subdivision.

References

 Western Maryland Railway Co., Baltimore, MD (1938). "Track Chart: Highfield to Emory Grove ."

External links
 Jacks Mountain Tunnel photos - Western Maryland Railway West Subdivision

Transportation buildings and structures in Adams County, Pennsylvania
Railroad tunnels in Pennsylvania
Western Maryland Railway tunnels